Dave Dillewaard (born 16 October 1983) is an Australian BMX Dirt and Freestyle rider. Dillewaard turned professional in 2002. Australian Dave Dillewaard has been making a steady climb up the park and dirt ranks in the past few years, escalating to a first-place finish in park at the June 2006 CFB in Oklahoma City.

Dave Dillewaard has continued his BMX path and is now a professional BMX judge. He ahs worked in some well known / biggest BMX stores including LUXBMX.  He now works for the Oldest and Biggest Australian BMX Wholesaler - BMX International.

Sponsors
Dave Dillewaard sponsors have included GT Bikes, Famous Stars and Straps and Demolition Parts.

Videos
Fox: Drama, Demoltion: Last Chance, End Search, Ride Bmx: Flip Side, Ride Bmx: Range of Motion

BMX P.I.G
Dillewaard took part in season 3 of BMX P.I.G in Singapore with partner Ryan Guettler For the fourth round Guettler and Dillewaard gave Darden and Brian Hunt some trouble along with Diogo Canina and Corey Martinez, but Rob and Brian managed to make it one more day to the finals. The BMX PIG championship for 2007 went to Morgan Wade and Gary Young.

Contest history

X-Games History

External links
Dave Dillewaard at espn.go.com
Dave Dillewaard at grindtv.com

1983 births
Living people
Australian male cyclists
BMX riders
Cyclists from Queensland